George R. Price House is a historic home located at Columbia, South Carolina. It was built in 1939, and is a two-story, "L"-shaped, steel-framed, masonry dwelling in the Streamline Moderne style.  It has a flat roof, glass block windows, multiple porches, and a three-car garage.

It was added to the National Register of Historic Places in 1998 by Elaine Gillespie, the owner at the time. She also started a tradition about that same time that has remained in place through several owners. She began placing two decorative robots on the upstairs front porch for holidays. She named them Freddie and Tobar and the community loved them so much the house became known at “The Robot House.”

References

Houses on the National Register of Historic Places in South Carolina
Moderne architecture in South Carolina
Houses completed in 1939
Houses in Columbia, South Carolina
National Register of Historic Places in Columbia, South Carolina